The Los Angeles Kings are a professional ice hockey team based in Los Angeles, California. They are members of the Pacific Division of the Western Conference of the National Hockey League (NHL). This is a list of players who have played at least one game for the Kings.

Key
 Appeared in a Kings game during the 2019–20 NHL season or is still part of the organization.
 Stanley Cup winner, retired jersey or elected to the Hockey Hall of Fame

The "Seasons" column lists the first year of the season of the player's first game and the last year of the season of the player's last game. For example, a player who played one game in the 2000–2001 season would be listed as playing with the team from 2000 to 2001, regardless of what calendar year the game occurred within.

Statistics complete as of the 2019–20 NHL season.

Goaltenders

Skaters

Statistical notes
a: As of the 2005–2006 NHL season, all games will have a winner, teams losing in overtime and shootouts are awarded one point thus the OTL stat replacees the tie statistic. The OTL column also includes SOL (Shootout losses).
b: Save percentage did not become an official NHL statistic until the 1982–83 season.  Therefore, goaltenders who played before 1982 do not have official save percentages.

Player notes
1: Byron Dafoe was born in  Sussex, England, but he grew up in British Columbia, Canada. However, he never represented Canada in international play. 
2: Yutaka Fukufuji is the first Japanese-born player in NHL history.
3: Kevin Brown was born in Birmingham, England, but moved to Canada as a child. However, he never represented Canada in international play.
4:Rick Chartraw was born in Caracas, Venezuela, but moved to Erie, Pennsylvania, at the age of four. Chartraw never represented the United States in international play.
5: Adam Deadmarsh was born in Trail, British Columbia, but held dual citizenship and chose to represent the United States in international play.
6: Randy Gilhen was born in Zweubruken, Germany but grew up in Winnipeg, Manitoba. However, Gilhen never represented Canada in international play.
7: Mark Hardy was born in Samedan, Switzerland, but represented Canada internationally.
8: Brady Murry was born in Brandon, Manitoba but represented the United States international.
9: Jim Paek was born in South Korea and as a child immigrated to Canada, which he also represented in international play. Paek was the first South Korean to ever play in the NHL.
10: Luc Robitaille served as captain for the first 39 games of the 1992–1993 season while Gretzky was out with an injury.
11: John Tripp was born in Canada, but represents Germany internationally.

References
General

hockeydb.com

Specific

Los Angeles Kings
 
players